Vexillum germaineae is a species of sea snail, a marine gastropod mollusk, in the family Costellariidae, the ribbed miters.

References

germaineae
Gastropods described in 2014